George Martin Mehrtens (5 February 1907 – 30 August 1954) was a New Zealand rugby union player. A fullback, Mehrtens represented Canterbury at a provincial level, and was a member of the New Zealand national side, the All Blacks, in 1928. He played three matches for the All Blacks but did not play any full internationals.

References

1907 births
1954 deaths
Canterbury rugby union players
New Zealand international rugby union players
New Zealand rugby union players
People educated at Christchurch Boys' High School
Rugby union fullbacks
Rugby union players from Rangiora